Anderson Andrielle Pereira Vieira, (born 30 April 1983 in Marabá), known as Anderson Marabá, is a Brazilian footballer who currently plays for Shensa Arak F.C.

Career
Anderson Marabá joined Shensa Arak F.C. in 2009

References

1983 births
Living people
Brazilian footballers
Shensa players
Expatriate footballers in Iran
Brazilian expatriate footballers
Esporte Clube Vitória players
Figueirense FC players
Paysandu Sport Club players
América Futebol Clube (RN) players
Clube Atlético Juventus players
Clube Náutico Capibaribe players
Shahrdari Bandar Abbas players
Association football defenders
People from Marabá
Sportspeople from Pará